Seven expansion packs were released for the 2000 life simulation video game The Sims, the first major title in The Sims series. All expansion packs were developed by Maxis for Microsoft Windows and Mac OS X. Windows versions were published by Electronic Arts, and Mac OS X versions were published by Aspyr. Expansion packs tend to focus on major new features, with many objects, clothes, styles, worlds and life states are geared towards the pack's major theme. The first expansion pack, Livin' Large, was released on August 27, 2000. The last expansion pack, Makin' Magic, was released on October 29, 2003.

Livin' Large 

The Sims: Livin' Large (known as The Sims: Livin' It Up in Europe) is the first expansion pack released for The Sims, released in North America on August 27, 2000 and Europe on September 8, 2000. The pack includes new characters, careers, items, and features. This expansion pack is also part of The Sims Deluxe Edition and later compilations of the core game.

Gameplay 
The game features new NPCs, such as Servo, the Tragic Clown, and the Grim Reaper. Santa Claus will come if the Sim leaves some cookies beside a Christmas tree, and a fireplace. Santa will leave presents under the tree. The Tragic Clown visits depressed Sims who own the Tragic Clown painting in order to cheer them up, always failing miserably. Sims can contract an illness from a bite by the guinea pig included in this expansion. The Grim Reaper performs the final rites for deceased Sims. Living Sims can plead with the Reaper to save that particular Sim, which will result in three possible outcomes: death, resurrection, or a zombie.

Livin' Large comes with many new objects, such as a crystal ball, electric guitar, chemistry set, and magic lamp. Some of the objects had new NPCs associated with them. For example, a genie appears from the magic lamp and a booth comes with a Servo.

Multiple neighborhoods were introduced in this expansion pack, allowing the player to have up to five new ones.

Reception 
Domestically, Livin' Large sold 263,076 units and earned $6.99 million by the end of October 2000, according to PC Data. By the end of the year, its sales totaled 595,410 units ($16.1 million) in the United States alone. This made it the country's sixth-best-selling computer game of 2000. Livin' Large remained the United States' sixth-highest computer game seller in 2001, with domestic sales of 818,600 units and revenues of $22.9 million that year alone.

House Party 

The Sims: House Party is the second expansion pack released for The Sims, released in North America on April 2, 2001. The pack gives players the ability and facilities to hold parties and gatherings in their Sims' homes. Drew Carey makes a cameo appearance in the game if the player's Sims hold a good enough party. Bad parties will be visited by a mime that tries to entertain Sims. Players can hire male or female entertainers who pop out of cakes, as well as caterers that cook meals.

Hot Date 

The Sims: Hot Date is the third expansion pack released for The Sims, released on November 14, 2001, with overall positive reviews thanks to the addition of a Downtown area as a sub-neighborhood, which became the set up for upcoming expansion packs in which new areas were added. Several concepts in Hot Date would be re-introduced in The Sims 2: Nightlife.

Gameplay 
In addition to many new items for households, the new downtown area is Hot Dates most significant new addition to The Sims. Sims can now use their telephones to call a taxi that takes them to downtown SimCity, which is composed of lots such as shopping centers, recreation areas, restaurants, or nightclubs. While a Sim is on a date, the Sim can be controlled, but not actually give orders to their date. Downtown features many brand-new, downtown-only items, like food vendors, clothing stores, picnic areas, and duck ponds that Sim couples can use to keep themselves busy, and a few new items, like the restaurant booth seat, that will let them get to know each other better.

All the time spent in Downtown takes place independent of time at home; in other words, Sims will get hungry, tired, and bored as usual during the time they spend downtown, but once they get home, the clock will actually reset to the time when they left. This makes having both a relationship and a job (which still typically takes about six hours out of a Sim's day) not only possible, but a lot easier than before.

The relationship bar with acquaintances the Sims know, now includes a daily bar at the top showing short-term trends with decay quickly and a long term bar showing long-term trends. This feature would be carried forward in later expansion packs for The Sims and The Sims 2.

Reception 
Overall, the game was judged to be the most substantial of The Sims expansion packs at its point of release, and critics praised the new downtown area.

Hot Date was received 86% and an 85% averages from aggregate sites GameRankings and Metacritic respectively. The Armchair Empire gave the game 9.2/10 points saying "Where Livin' Large and House Party were basically enhancements to the original, Hot Date completely revamps the gameplay by making it possible to focus more on social and romantic relationships and for the first time get away from the Sims house.

Hot Date was a nominee for Computer Gaming Worlds 2001 "Best Game Expansion" award, which ultimately went to Baldur's Gate II: Throne of Bhaal. The editors wrote, "Hot Date added the one thing The Sims players clamored for, which was the ability to actually leave the house." Similarly, the editors of Computer Games Magazine nominated Hot Date as the best add-on of 2001, but ultimately gave the award to Diablo II: Lord of Destruction.

The Academy of Interactive Arts & Sciences nominated Hot Date for its 2001 "Innovation in Computer Gaming" award, which ultimately went to Black & White.

Vacation 
The Sims: Vacation (known as The Sims: On Holiday in the UK, Ireland, China, Portugal and Scandinavia) is the fourth expansion pack released for The Sims. It was released on March 28, 2002. The pack introduces a new destination called "Vacation Island" where Sims can take vacations with family members or with other Sims and marks the first time Sims can stay on lots away from home. Players can save the game while a Sim is on Vacation Island. The pack also allows Sims to purchase or find souvenirs, stay at a hotel, or rent a tent/igloo. The concept of travelling to different areas in Vacation would be re-introduced in The Sims 2: Bon Voyage.

Gameplay 
Vacation introduced a new neighborhood, called Vacation Island, where Sims could take vacations with members of their own family or with other Sims. Vacation Island is split into three distinct environments: beach, forest, and snow-capped mountain. Each environment has its own mascot: a yeti for the mountain, an archer for the forest, and a hammerhead shark for the beach. This pack also introduces the "winterwear" clothing category; to be worn on any lot in the mountain environment of Vacation Island.

To take a vacation, a Sim must use the phone and call a vacation van. The player gets to choose a location for the Sims to go to; at each location, Sims may either stay for the day or for several days by checking into a hotel, or can rent a tent or igloo to sleep in for one day at a time. If Sims do not check out from their hotel on time, then they get charged to stay another day. Check out time is 11 am for hotels, igloos and tents. There are three different lots within each vacation environment. Each area has its own amenities; the mountain summit has snowboard slopes and icy slides, while the beach has sandcastles and swimming pools, and the camping area has archery ranges and fishing docks. Sims cannot live on Vacation Island; however, some items available on Vacation Island may be purchased to be placed at home.

Sims can get souvenirs from the Vacation Director, the metal detector, or from a prize booth. Players can purchase a souvenir display case for their Sims' houses to display their souvenirs. The memory associated with a souvenir depends on the Sim's mood at the time they got the souvenir. There are three types of souvenir: bought, found, and won. Won souvenirs, also called super souvenirs, are acquired by staying in one area for a long time and having the entire family in a good mood. Found souvenirs, also called relics, are dug up with a metal detector. Bought souvenirs simply require Sims play games that give out tickets, and then use them to buy the souvenirs.

Unleashed 
The Sims: Unleashed is the fifth expansion pack released for The Sims. It was released on November 7, 2002. The pack introduces cats and dogs into the game. The pack also introduces farming and gardening, and expands original 10-lot neighborhood to over 40 lots, with the added ability to rezone these lots for residential or community use. Community lots can be modified to shops, cafes, and other commercial establishments.

Small pets like birds, fish and reptiles are also introduced. The concept of owning pets would be later re-introduced in The Sims 2: Pets, The Sims 3: Pets and The Sims 4: Cats & Dogs.

Gameplay 
In Unleashed, Sims can now adopt pets for their families, particularly dogs and cats. Dogs and cats count as members of a family, while other pets become part of the household and are treated as objects. Pets can be adopted from the local adoption center. There, players choose the pet's species, breed, and name. Players cannot choose their personality points; pets come with random personality points. With Makin' Magic, pets can be turned into Sims by using a spell. The game also introduces pet birds, fish, turtles, and iguanas, though these animals simply act as objects. Families that have eight Sims cannot adopt a dog or a cat.

Normal Sims can interact with pet dogs and cats in different ways, such as rubbing, playing and clapping. Other social moves include praising and scolding. Pets can also be trained to obey Sims, either by normal Sims or the local Pet Trainer, and can be entered into a pet show at community lots.

Superstar 
The Sims: Superstar is the sixth expansion pack released for The Sims. It was released on May 13, 2003. The pack allows Sims to become entertainment figures and includes representations of several famous personalities.

Various new work and leisure items are also included. The concept of fame in Superstar would be re-introduced in The Sims 3: Late Night and The Sims 4: Get Famous.

Gameplay 
A new destination called Studio Town, which functions as a workplace for celebrity Sims where regular visits may be required to maintain their fame and career, marking the first time where players can follow their Sims to work. Going to Studio Town freezes the clock for the household.

Becoming a Superstar requires near high levels of the Charisma, Creativity, and Body skills. Other personal attributes are also required, as well as maintaining a network of famous friends, and luck in producing good records, films, and runway shows.  Sims that have developed their personal attributes enough can easily move between the different categories of superstar, allowing the player to change career as they choose.  If a Sim performs exceedingly well, they may be visited at their home by a "fading star" to receive an Oscar-like statue called a "Simmy" for all-around success. They may also receive awards in Studio Town for success in individual categories to bring home and put on display.

Non-celebrity Sims are allowed to visit Studio Town for leisure. Celebrities may make cameo appearances in Studio Town but cannot be controlled by the player. The list of celebrities includes Avril Lavigne, Andy Warhol, Marilyn Monroe, Jon Bon Jovi, Christina Aguilera, Freddie Prinze Jr., Sarah McLachlan, Jennifer Lopez and Richie Sambora.

Makin' Magic 

The Sims: Makin' Magic is the seventh and final expansion pack released for The Sims. It was released on October 29, 2003. The pack introduces magic to the game and allows Sims to cast spells, forge charms, and buy alchemical ingredients. The pack introduces the Magic Town neighborhood, as well as Magic Town lots, which house vendors of magical ingredients and items and a number of magic-related mini-games.

Baking and nectar-making are also introduced. Adds additional residential lots in Magic Town, which contain new aesthetic accents such as new grass textures, background sound effects, and a higher chance of growing magical items, marking the first time that Sims may live outside of the main neighborhood. The game includes a disc with a preview of The Sims 2, which would be released in 2004.

The concept of magic in Makin' Magic would be re-introduced in The Sims 2: Apartment Life, The Sims 3: Supernatural and The Sims 4: Realm of Magic.

Gameplay 
The main feature of the pack is the ability for Sims to create magic charms and cast spells, which work much like cooking meals from a recipe book. Ingredients are added to a Sim's inventory, from where they are used with the correct equipment to produce an item of food, or charge the Sim's magic wand with a spell, or produce a charm. These ingredients, which are many and varied, can be purchased in Magic Town or made at home with various machines and items that can be purchased. The ability to have a dragon as a pet was also introduced.

Upon moving in a new family, the Mystery Man appears with a box which includes a wand, a spell book, the magic ingredients needed for the Toadification spell, a wand charger (which also dispenses wands), 35 MagiCoins, and a Hole In The Ground which provides easy access to Magic Town.

Being caught casting spells outside of Magic Town by non-magical Sims is met with a fine by the Mystery Man. However this is not the case in Magic Town, although the spells may backfire as the vast majority of Magic Town residents are equipped with their own wands.

References

External links 
 Official The Sims site

The Sims (video game) expansion packs
Electronic Arts games
Classic Mac OS games
MacOS games
Social simulation video games
Video games featuring protagonists of selectable gender
Video games scored by Jerry Martin
Windows games
Life simulation games
D.I.C.E. Award for Strategy/Simulation Game of the Year winners
Video games developed in the United States